Formula racing (known as open-wheel racing in North America) is any of several forms of open-wheeled single-seater motorsport. The origin of the term lies in the nomenclature that was adopted by the FIA for all of its post-World War II single-seater regulations, or formulae. The best known of these formulae are Formula One, Formula E, Formula Two, Formula Three, regional Formula Three and Formula Four. Common usage of "formula racing" encompasses other single-seater series, including the GP2 Series, which replaced Formula 3000 (which had itself been the effective replacement for Formula Two).

Categories such as Formula Three and FIA Formula 2 Championship are described as feeder formulae, which refers to their position below Formula One on the career ladder of single-seater motor racing. There are two primary forms of racing formula: the open formula that allows a choice of chassis or engines and the control or "spec" formula that relies on a single supplier for chassis and engines. Formula Three is an example of an open formula, while Formula BMW is a control formula. There are also some exceptions on these two forms like Formula Ford where there is an open chassis formula but a restricted single brand engine formula.

World championships

Formula One

In the process of reviving Grand Prix racing after the end of World War II, the Fédération Internationale de l'Automobile's Commission Sportive Internationale was responsible for defining the standardised regulations of Formula One (F1) in 1946. The first race to be run to the early Formula One regulations was a non-championship Grand Prix in Turin in September 1946. The first officially recognised Formula One season was held in 1947 and the World Championship for Drivers was inaugurated in 1950. This was the first example of formula racing.

Formula E

Formula E is the highest class of competition for single-seat, electrically-powered racing cars, which held its inaugural season in 2014–15. Conceived in 2012, the championship was intended by the FIA to serve as an R&D platform for the electric vehicle and promote interest in EVs and sustainability. The series races predominately on temporary circuits in cities such as New York, Hong Kong, Zürich, Berlin, Rome, and Paris in events known as "ePrix". In order to cap costs but maintain technological development, the series uses a spec chassis and battery that must be used by all entrants, with competing teams permitted to design and build their own motors, inverter and rear suspension. The series has gained significant traction in recent years.

International championships

Formula 2 
 
Designed to make racing affordable and to make it the perfect training ground for life in F1, F2 has made it mandatory for all of the teams to use the same chassis, engine, and tyre supplier.

Formula 3 
 
In 2019, the GP3 Series was replaced by international Formula 3, just in the same way that GP2 was rebranded as Formula 2 in 2017. The series' first drivers’ champion was Robert Shwartzman driving for Prema Racing, who also won the Constructors’ Championship for that year. At the end of the year, the FIA Formula 3 World Cup takes place during the Macau Grand Prix as a non-championship, season-ending event.

Regional championships

Formula Regional 

Formula Regional is the last category that takes place outside the F1 events format. Each championship corresponds to one specific region: Asia (under the F3 name), Americas, Europe, and Japan (under the FR name). Alongside official FIA championships, parallel series such as the Toyota Racing Series (New Zealand), and the W Series (worldwide) use the same technical regulations.

National championships

Formula 4 

FIA Formula 4, also called FIA F4, is an open-wheel racing car category intended for junior drivers. There is no global championship, but rather individual nations or regions can host their own championships in compliance with a universal set of rules and specifications. The category was created by the Fédération Internationale de l'Automobile (FIA)—the International sanctioning and administrative body for motorsport—as an entry-level category for young drivers, bridging the gap between karting and Formula 3. The series is a part of the FIA Global Pathway.

North America

IndyCar Series

The IndyCar Series is the premier level of formula racing in North America. The sport, in general, traces its roots as far back as 1905. The current series, founded by then-Indianapolis Motor Speedway CEO Tony George, began in 1996 as the "Indy Racing League" (IRL). In 2008, the series merged with the rival Champ Car World Series, formerly known as CART, to form the IndyCar Series. A typical IndyCar season contains races on a mixture of natural terrain road courses, temporary street circuits, short track ovals, and larger, high-speed ovals (also known as Superspeedways); including the historic Indianapolis 500.

Indy Lights

Indy Lights is the top feeder series for the IndyCar Series, similar to F1's relationship with Formula 2. The original Indy Lights (known as "American Racing Series") acted as a developmental circuit for CART from 1986 to 2001. The current series was founded in 2002 by IndyCar.

Indy Pro 2000 Championship

The Indy Pro 2000 Championship has been an officially sanctioned development series since 2011, when it became governed by IndyCar, although the original series started in 1991 as the Star Mazda Championship. Drivers currently use Tatuus F4-T014 cars badged as PM-18 and use 2L Mazda MZR engines.

U.S. F2000

The U.S. F2000 National Championship is an American variation of the Formula Ford. The series was initially founded by Dan Andersen and Mike Foschi in 1990 and regularly fielded over 60 entries per race. In 2001, the series was sold to Jon Baytos who introduced a number of controversial rule changes that brought the series out of alignment with similar SCCA classes, which led to a reduction in participation and the end of the series in 2006. In 2010, the series returned under the leadership of Andersen with the intent to return F2000 to its status as a feeder formula for higher open wheel racing classes in the United States.

Japan

Super Formula

Super Formula, previously known as Formula Nippon, is the premier level of Japanese formula racing. It began as the Japanese Formula 2000 series in 1973 and continued to use Formula Two regulations after European Formula Two had ended in 1984. In 1987 the series switched to the Formula 3000 standard so that Japanese and European regulations paralleled one another again. However, in 1996, the International Formula 3000 series became a one-make format to reduce costs and the Japanese Formula broke away, changing the series' name to Formula Nippon. Formula Nippon featured chassis supplied by Lola, Reynard and G-Force until 2001 and 2002 when G-Force and Reynard withdrew, while Mugen-Honda supplied most engines. In 2006, the regulations were changed drastically – the chassis was replaced and engines were now provided by Toyota and Honda. The engines had the same specifications as those used in the 2005 IndyCar Series.

Super Formula Lights

JAF-F4

Other Formula series

 ADAC Formel Masters
 Atlantic Championship
 China Formula Grand Prix
 EuroBOSS Series
 Euroformula Open Championship 
 F1 in Schools
 Florida Winter Series
 Formula 1000
 Formula 4000 powered by Holden
 Formula 500
 Formula Acceleration 1
 Formula Atlantic
 Formula BMW
 Formula Car Challenge
 Formula Continental
 Formula D
 Formula Ford
 Formula Ford 1600
 Formula LGB Hyundai
 Formula LGB Swift
 Formula Maruti
 Formula Masters China
 Formula Renault 
 Formula SAE 
 Formula SCCA
 Formula Student
 Formula Vee
 Formula Volkswagen South Africa Championship
 GB3 Championship
 Masters Historic Formula One Championship
 Monoposto Racing Club
 S5000 Australian Drivers' Championship
 Toyota Racing Series
 W Series

Defunct series

Formula series from the 21st century that could be categorised between Tier 1 and Tier 5 (see top of page), but are now defunct, are described below.

Formula Two (1947–1985; 2009–2012)

The Formula Two regulations were first defined in 1947 as a form of B-class below Formula One. It was not unusual for some Formula One events to include a number of F2 entries in the same field and the entries in the World Championship seasons of 1952–53 comprised exclusively F2 cars for reasons of cost. F2 had a patchy history until the inauguration of the European Formula Two Championship in 1967. F2 was an open formula that allowed the use of any chassis that met the prescribed regulations; it was well supported during the 1970s, with chassis from Tecno, March Engineering, Toleman, Ralt, Matra and others. The European championship ran continually until the creation of its successor, Formula 3000, in 1985. In 2008 it was announced by the FIA that Formula Two would return in 2009 in the form of the FIA Formula Two Championship. This series was discontinued after the 2012 season.

Formula 3000 (1985–2004)

The Formula 3000 was created by the Fédération Internationale de l'Automobile in 1985 to become the final step for drivers before entering Formula One. Formula Two had become too expensive and was dominated by works-run cars with factory engines. Formula 3000 offered quicker, cheaper, more open racing. The series began as an open formula, but in 1986 tyres were standardized, followed by engines and chassis in 1996. The series ran until 2004 and was replaced in 2005 by the GP2 Series.

International Formula Master (2005–2009)

International Formula Master, a.k.a. Formula Super 2000, was conceived as a competitor for Formula Three. It started in 2005 as the 3000 Pro Series, organised by Peroni Promotion. MTC Organisation took over in 2006 and turned it into a support series for the WTCC. Drivers used second-hand Formula 2000 cars made by Tatuus that were powered by a 250 hp Honda K20A engine.

A1 Grand Prix (2005–2009)

A1 Grand Prix (A1GP) was unique in its field in that competitors solely represented their nation as opposed to themselves or a team, the usual format in most formula racing series. As such, it was often promoted as the "World Cup of Motorsport". Also, the series attracted equal numbers of (former or future) Formula One drivers and IndyCar Series drivers. The concept was founded by Sheikh Al Maktoum of Dubai in 2004, but sold to the FIA in 2005. The races were held in the traditional Formula One off-season, the northern hemisphere winter. Between 2005 and 2009 29 countries from five continents participated.

Superleague Formula (2008–2011)

Using 750 hp V12 engines, Superleague Formula introduced team sponsorship by association football clubs. In qualifying, the link with football was also present as the series employed a system based on a group stage to knock-out format used in some football tournaments. Another unique feature of Superleague Formula was the Super Final, a five-lap shootout between the six best drivers of a weekend. In 2010, the series offered the biggest prize fund in European motorsport with the champion set to earn €1 million. In theory, it would be possible for a driver to earn up to €2.2 million over the course of the season. This was all done to give drivers a chance to earn a living from motorsport. By 2011, the link with football was fading with more than half the teams no longer associated with football teams, The later races of the season did not take place, and no further seasons were organised.

Formula Dream (1999–2005)

See: Formula Challenge Japan

Formula V6 Asia (2006–2009)

Formula Asia V6 (Renault) was launched in 2006 to give Southeast Asian-based drivers a chance to progress from karting through junior single-seaters to international motorsport. Karun Chandhok, for example, won the 2006 championship and was rewarded with a test in a World Series by Renault car at Paul Ricard. Drivers ran with Tatuus chassis, a Renault 3.5L V6 engine and Michelin tyres.

Auto GP (1999)

The Auto GP World Series' roots can be traced back to 1999 and the Italian Formula 3000 series. At first, nearly all races were held in Italy, but the series expanded throughout Europe quickly. In 2001 the series became European Formula 3000 and in 2004 Superfund became the title sponsor, planning to set up the Formula Superfund series. However, the funding was pulled and the series was cancelled. Therefore, Coloni Motorsport re-established the Italian Formula 3000 and expanded this in 2006 to the Euroseries 3000. In 2010, the first-generation A1 Grand Prix cars replaced the Lola F3000 chassis and the Auto GP name was adopted.

See also
 Open-wheel car

Notes and references